Istok is a rural locality (a selo) in Kabansky District, Republic of Buryatia, Russia. The population was 262 as of 2010. There are 6 streets.

Geography 
Istok is located 39 km northwest of Kabansk (the district's administrative centre) by road. Istomino is the nearest rural locality.

References 

Rural localities in Kabansky District
Populated places on Lake Baikal